Sanjana Sarathy is an Indian actress and model who mainly works in the Tamil film industry. She is best known for her small role as Jagdeesh's (played by Vijay) sister in the 2012 Tamil film, Thuppakki. She had modeled for several brands such as Cinthol, Amazon firestick, 7up, Pizza Hut, AVT tea, 7UP madras Gig and Ace2Three.

Early life and education 
Sanjana was born to Vijay Sarathy and Rajie Vijay Sarathy on 25 July 1995. She did her schooling a St.Michael's Academy, Chennai. She graduated in B.Sc. in Electronic Media at M.O.P. Vaishnav College for Women, Chennai and M.Sc. in Electronic Media at Anna University, Chennai. Finishing her studies, she started working for a news media company at Hong Kong.

Career 
Though Sanjana made her acting debut through Vazhakku Enn 18/9 directed by Balaji Shakthivel, she became popular through Thuppakki, playing the youngest sister of Jagdeesh, played by Vijay. She also appears in musical video, 7up Madras gig's season 2 – Avizhaai. She was praised for her performance in the 2019 ZEE5 web series Fingertip.

Sanjana is currently working as female lead in Ninaivo oru paravai, where the male lead is performed by Jump Cuts - Hari Bhaskar

Sanjana is also a stylist running her own designer label named Chatterfox. She also performed during Yuvan Shankar Raja's 2019 US tour.

Filmography

Web series

References

External links 

1993 births
Living people
Actresses in Tamil cinema
Female models from Tamil Nadu